The South Stack Formation is a sequence of Cambro-Ordovician (Furongian to Tremadocian) metasedimentary rocks exposed in northwestern Anglesey, North Wales. The outcrop of this formation at South Stack was chosen as one of the top 100 geosites in the United Kingdom by the Geological Society of London, for its display of small-scale folding.

References

Further reading 

 Phillips, E, 1991. Progressive deformation of the South Stack and New Harbour Groups, Holy Island, Western Anglesey, North Wales. Quarterly Journal of the Geological Society, Vol.148, p. 1091-1100
 Shackleton, R M, 1954. The structure and succession of Anglesey and the Lleyn Peninsula. British Association for the Advancement of Science, Vol.11, p. 106-108
 Greenly, E. 1919. Geology of Anglesey. Memoir of the Geological Survey, UK
 Blake, J F, 1888. The Monian System of rocks. Quarterly Journal of the Geological Society, Vol.44, p. 476-480

Geologic formations of Wales
Cambrian System of Europe
Ordovician System of Europe
Cambrian Wales
Ordovician Wales
Furongian
Tremadocian
Sandstone formations
Mudstone formations
Geology of Anglesey